Sergio R. Ortiz-Luis Jr. is a management practitioner in the Philippines. He is the Chairman of the Philippine Chamber of Commerce and Industry (PCCI), the official chamber of commerce of the Philippines. He is the honorary chairman and president of the Employers Confederation of the Philippines (ECOP).

Education

Ortiz-Luis holds degrees in Bachelor of Arts and Bachelor of Science in Business Administration from De La Salle College (now De La Salle University-Manila College of Business and Economics). He also obtained a Master of Business Administration from De La Salle Graduate School (now De La Salle Professional Schools Graduate School of Business). He was conferred Doctor of Humanities(honoris Causa) by the Central Luzon State University in 2006.

Career

Ortiz-Luis is the President of the Philippine Exporters Confederation, Inc. (PHILEXPORT). He is concurrently the Chairman of the Export and Industry Bank, a Philippine-based bank catering to the export industries.

He is the Chairman of the EIB Realty & Development Corporation, the real estate subsidiary of the Export and Industry Bank. He is the Founding Director of the Manila Exposition Complex, Inc., now popularly known as the World Trade Center in the Philippines.

Organizational affiliations

Ortiz-Luis is the Chairman of the Philippine Chamber of Commerce and Industry (PCCI). He is also a Commissioner of the Social Security System, the official social service provider of private companies in the country.

He is the Vice-Chairman of the Export Development Council of the Philippines; Vice-Chairman, Philippine Small and Medium Scale Enterprises Development Foundation; and Vice President and Governor of the Employers Confederation of the Philippines, the largest association of employers in the country.

Diplomacy

Ortiz-Luis has been appointed Honorary Consul General of the Consulate of Romania in the Philippines.

External links
Philippine Chamber of Commerce and Industry
Export and Industry Bank
De La Salle Professional Schools Graduate School of Business

References 

20th-century Filipino businesspeople
De La Salle University alumni
Living people
Year of birth missing (living people)
21st-century Filipino businesspeople